Stuart Henry  (24 February 1942 – 24 November 1995) was a Scottish disc jockey on pirate radio station Radio Scotland from January 1966 to September 1967.  He then worked at BBC Radio 1 from its start in 1967.  Between 1967 and 1969 he was one of the regular presenters of BBC's Top of the Pops. He left the BBC in 1974 to join Radio Luxembourg.

Biography

Early life and acting career
Born in Edinburgh Henry attended Stewart's Melville College in the city after which he trained at Glasgow College of Dramatic Art.  His early career started as an actor for six years having had appearances in Dr. Finlay's Casebook and Z-Cars, and films such as the 1970 musical Toomorrow in which he played the part of the compere.

Pirate DJ work, Radio 1 and Radio Luxembourg
On 1 January, 1966 he started in radio and became a pirate DJ with Radio Scotland although suffered from seasickness on the ship, named The Comet, and so was delighted to accept a new job, just over a year later, with the new BBC station Radio 1.  On his shows, whilst working on Radio 1, he enabled the broadcaster to find missing young people and called it She's Leaving Home using the tune recorded by The Beatles called She's Leaving Home, a track from their 1967 album Sgt. Pepper's Lonely Hearts Club Band.  He would encourage young people to contact the station by telephone enabling their parents to be aware that they were safe and well.  He also presented a programme on the station called Midday Spin and a successful Saturday morning show called Noise at Nine.
The opening theme music to his Radio 1 shows was Soul Finger a 1967 track recorded by the Bar Kays.  At the peak of his career with the station, in the early seventies, his show attracted audiences regularly of more than 11 million.

In later years with Radio 1 he began to slur his speech, caused by his condition with multiple scelrosis and he was eventually sacked in 1974 after which he then went to work with Radio Luxembourg in 1975.  His speech deteriorated further until his wife, Ollie, assisted with his presentations and newsreading.  His show became known as The Stu and Ollie Show.  He remained at Radio Luxembourg for 12 years until 1987.

Personal life and death
Henry married Ollie (1943-2020), a former model, in 1976. He suffered for many years with multiple sclerosis, the illness accounting for his later distinctive rather halting speech delivery. Ollie dedicated the remaining years of their married life to providing round-the-clock care for Henry.

Henry died on 24 November 1995.  On 2 December 2004 he was posthumously inducted into the Radio Academy Hall of Fame, honouring his outstanding contribution to UK radio.  His wife Ollie died in Wales on 12th August 2020 aged 77.

Filmography

References

External links
 Radio Academy biography of Stuart Henry
 Stuart Henry photo page
 Radio Rewind audio and photog

1942 births
1995 deaths
Entertainers from Edinburgh
British radio DJs
Pirate radio personalities
Offshore radio broadcasters
People educated at Stewart's Melville College
Radio Luxembourg (English) presenters
20th-century British musicians
BBC Radio 1 presenters
Top of the Pops presenters